Virendra Kumar Singh  is an Indian politician. He was elected to the Lok Sabha, the lower house of the Parliament of India from the  Aurangabad in Bihar as a member of the Janata Dal. He is the former MLA for Nabinagar.

References

External links
 Official biographical sketch in Parliament of India website

Janata Dal politicians
India MPs 1996–1997
Lok Sabha members from Bihar
1953 births
Living people